The Anguilla national football team is the national team of Anguilla, a British Overseas Territory in the Caribbean, and is controlled by the Anguilla Football Association. It is affiliated to the Caribbean Football Union of CONCACAF. Along with the teams from the Bahamas, Tonga, Bhutan, Eritrea, San Marino, and Somalia, they are consistently one of the lowest ranked teams in the world in the FIFA rankings.

As of 14 December 2022, they rank 210th in the FIFA rankings, placing in the last two lowest ranked teams.

History

2002 World Cup qualification

Anguilla entered the World Cup qualifiers for the first time for the 2002 World Cup in South Korea and Japan.

In the first round of the qualifiers, Anguilla were drawn against the Bahamas. On 5 March 2000, Anguilla hosted the first leg in front of 250 people at Webster Park in The Valley, losing by a scoreline of 3–1. In front of a Bahamian crowd of just 330, the second leg was played at the Thomas Robinson Stadium in Nassau on 19 March 2000, with Anguilla losing 2–1, and thereby eliminated by an aggregate scoreline of 5–2.

2006 World Cup qualification

During the qualifiers for the 2006 World Cup in Germany, Anguilla faced the Dominican Republic in the first round. The first leg was played to a goalless draw at the Estadio Olímpico Juan Pablo Duarte in Santo Domingo on 19 March 2004. Newly introduced FIFA stadium requirements forced Anguilla to play their "home" leg at the same Dominican Republic stadium two days later, with the Dominican Republic winning the second leg and thus the first round by a scoreline of 6–0.

2010 World Cup qualification

During the qualifiers for the 2010 World Cup in South Africa, Anguilla was drawn against El Salvador in the first round. On 6 February 2008, they lost 12–0 at the Estadio Cuscatlán in San Salvador, where striker Rudis Corrales scored five times and Ronald Cerritos three. This time, Anguilla played their "home leg" at RFK Stadium in Washington, D.C. in the United States on 26 March 2008. In front of 22,670 spectators, Anguilla lost the second leg 4–0, thereby losing to El Salvador by an aggregate score of 16–0.

2014 World Cup qualification

In the first round of the qualifiers for the 2014 World Cup in Brazil, Anguilla were again drawn to play the Dominican Republic, as they had eight years previously. On 8 July 2011, they lost 2–0 at the Estadio Panamericano in San Cristobal, and losing 4–0 in the same Dominican Republic stadium just two days later. This put the Dominican Republic through to the second round with the same 6–0 aggregate scoreline as their previous encounter.

2018 World Cup qualification

In the first round of the qualifiers for the 2018 World Cup in Russia, Anguilla were drawn to play Nicaragua. On 23 March 2015, they lost the first leg 5–0 at the Estadio Nacional Dennis Martínez in Managua, Nicaragua and, on 29 March 2015, were eliminated at Ronald Webster Park in The Valley in Anguilla with a 3–0 loss, to send Nicaragua through to the second round by a score of 8–0 on aggregate.

2022 World Cup qualification

In the first round of the qualifiers for the 2022 World Cup in Qatar, Anguilla were drawn into group D with Dominica, Barbados, Dominican Republic, and Panama, whom they’d each play once. Their first match of the campaign was against Dominican Republic on 27 March 2021, at the DRV PNK Stadium in Fort Lauderdale. This game would make it the 3rd time the two teams faced in World Cup qualifying games. Anguilla lost 6–0, making this the same as the last two aggregate scores for the teams. On 31 March 2021, they faced Barbados at Estadio Olímpico Félix Sánchez in Santo Domingo, Anguilla lost to a late 1–0 goal by Emile Saimovici. Then, on 2 June 2021 they lost 3–0 to Dominica at Estadio Olímpico Félix Sánchez in Santo Domingo. And on 6 July, at Estadio Nacional de Panamá in Panama City, Anguilla suffered a massive 13–0 defeat. They ended of round 1 with 0 points, 0 goals, and 23 goals against.

Overall World Cup qualification record
The pair of shutouts against Nicaragua in March 2015 extended Anguilla's scoreless run in World Cup qualification to eight matches, encompassing three World Cups over an eleven-year period. The goals Anguilla scored in March 2000 against the Bahamas in each leg of their first World Cup qualifying appearance remain their only two goals, with 41 goals conceded, no wins, one draw and nine losses from their ten World Cup qualifying matches to date.

Results and fixtures

The following is a list of match results in the last 12 months, as well as any future matches that have been scheduled.

2022

2023

Coaching history

 Clifton Livingston (2000)
 Scott Cooper (2002)
 Vernon Hodge (2003-2004)
 Benjamin Davies (2004)
 Vernon Hodge (2004–2007)
 Kerthney Carty (2008)
 Colin Johnson (2008–2009)
 Scott Cooper (2010)
 Colin Johnson (2010–2015)
 Richard Orlowski (2015)
 Leon Jeffers (2016)
 Romare Kelsick (2016–2018)
 Nigel Connor (2018–2020)
 Stern John (2020–2022)
 Nigel Connor (2022–)

Players

Current squad 
The following players were called up for the friendly match against Saint Martin on 4 March 2023.

Caps and goals are updated as of 4 March 2023, after the match against Saint Martin.

 Recent call-ups 
The following players have also been called up for the team in the last twelve months.

Player recordsPlayers in bold are still active with Anguilla''.

Most appearances

Most goals

Competitive record

World Cup record

Gold Cup record

Notes

CONCACAF Nations League record

Caribbean Cup record

Head-to-head record

References

External links
Antigua & Barbuda – Anguilla, Digicel Caribbean Cup 2007, YouTube
Barbados – Anguilla, Digicel Caribbean Cup 2007, YouTube
El Salvador – Anguilla 12–0, 2008-02-06, 2010 WCQ, YouTube
Anguilla – El Salvador 0–4, 2008-03-26, 2010 WCQ, YouTube

 
Caribbean national association football teams